Dugopolje is a municipality in Croatia in the Split-Dalmatia County.  

The name Dugopolje literally translates as 'long field'. The town has a population of over 3469, 99.5% which are Croats.  Noted in Dugopolje is Vranjača cave.  Dugopolje is located 15 km from the city of Split. 

Dugopolje is located at the junction of the A1 Zagreb–Split–Dubrovnik motorway linking the north and the south of Croatia and the D1 Split-Sinj state road linking the coast and the hinterland of Central Dalmatia. Split Airport is 28 km from Dugopolje, making the area an attractive place to stay for those wanting to avoid crowded areas closer to Split. Other transportation options are also close by with the Split ferry terminal and Split railway station less than 20 km away.

Main sites

Vranjača Cave 

Located a short drive from Dugopolje in the village of Kotlenice (in the Dalmatian hinterland), the Vranjača Cave is increasingly becoming a popular tourist destination for those interested in exploring nature. 

The 65 meter deep cave was first discovered in 1903 by Stipe Punda and first became open to the public in 1929. The cave is estimated to be 65 to 70 million years old.

History

Dugopolje's first mentioning dates back to 1283, when it was under the administration of neighbouring Klis

The area near the Kapela hamlet is a site of a former Roman road bifurcation of the Salona - Aequum pathway and Tilurium - Argentaria pathway. Many graveyards from approximately the 4th century were found nearby, implying that the Ilyrians descended from the hills and built a settlement there road-side.

While Dugopolje was not harmed in World War I, World War II brought many devastations. The village was damaged by all the sides, whether it was Italians, Germans, Chetniks or Partisans. It was first sieged by Italians in January 1942 on their way to Split through the Rera railway, killing 7 peasants and burning down several houses in the process. In April 1942 partisans killed Don Šimun Karaman, a local priest. 

Perhaps the most noted massacre of Croats in Dugopolje and its neighbouring villages, occurred in October 1942. It was committed by Chetniks, supported by Italian forces. The October 1942 massacre took place at the same time as the Gata massacre, that was also nearby; Chetnik and Italian forces killed at least thirty-two Croat civilians while Croatian historian Zdravko Dizdar mentions 120 civilians killed in Dugopolje and neighbouring villages.
 
By the end of 1943, over 300 houses were burnt down by numerous sides, and many civilians were murdered. Dugopolje fell into the Partisan arms in late 1944.

After World War II, Dugopolje was a part of Yugoslavia, and fell under the administration of Solin municipality, and eventually had electricity and waterlines installed. Many inhabitants of the village took part in the Croatian War of Independence, although the village itself wasn't harmed during the period. After the war, Dugopolje gained its own municipality and the leading local party was HDZ. At first, it was a transit spot for passengers on the D1 road between Split and Sinj, but in the early 21st century, the A1 motorway was built, and Dugopolje became the important intersection towards Split, thus providing the opportunity to Zlatko Ževrnja who was the Dugopolje mayor at the time, to design and build the biggest industrial zone in Dalmatia, which at one point had more people working in it than the population of the whole village.

People from Dugopolje

Andrija Balić (born 1997), football player 
Petar Bosančić (born 1996), football player
Mijo Caktaš (born 1992), football player 
Josip Radošević (born 1994), football player
Lorenco Šimić (born 1996), football player
Ivano Balić, handball player

See also
Jadro River   
NK Dugopolje
Split

References

Populated places in Split-Dalmatia County
Municipalities of Croatia